Lubov Vasilievna Zadorozhnaya (born 3 November 1942) is a retired Soviet cyclist. She won two silver medals at the UCI Road World Championships in 1967 and 1972, as well as a bronze medal at the UCI Track Cycling World Championships in 1972. During her career she won 15 national titles.

References

1942 births
Living people
Soviet female cyclists